The Palazzo delle Assicurazioni Generali is a building  in the Piazza della Signoria in Florence, Italy. Originally the Palazzo Fenzi, built for the Fenzi banking  family and designed in the Neo-Renaissance style by Giuseppe Martelli  and is one of the very few purpose built commercial buildings in the centre of the city though it housed on the upper floors reception rooms for the Fenzi family.

The site was formerly occupied by the "Pisan Loggia" and the "Chiese de Santa Cecilia"   While the architecture of the palazzo is undoubtedly inspired by that of the Palazzo Medici Riccardi, also in Florence, the Palazzo delle Assicurazioni Generali was never intended to be a  private house but the local headquarters of the General Insurance Company which was founded in Trieste in  1831.  There are other Palazzi delle Assicurazioni Generali in other Italian cities most notably Rome and Milan. During the latter half of the 19th century the Assicurazioni Generali (commonly known as "Generali") were expanding not only in Italy but also throughout Europe.

The Assicurazioni Generali generally employed retrospective architectural style to reflect the surroundings of their offices in Rome the palazzo imitates the Palazzo Venezia which it faces, while in Milan the Palazzo delle Assicurazioni Generali is in a form of 19th century Baroque known as Beaux Arts.

The Florence Palazzo delle Assicurazioni unsuccessfully vies for dominance in the piazza with the more historical and architecturally important Palazzo Signoria, today known as the Palazzo Vecchio. In spite of its height and size the architecture of the Palazzo delle Assicurazioni Generali harmonises with that of the surrounding buildings, and does not appear as a new imposter in the piazza. However, this is not a view shared by all, one source describes those buildings of Piazza della Signoria occupied by banks and Insurance companies as "seeming to belong to some cold northern climate rather than to the city that gave birth to the colour and vitality of the Renaissance"   Part of the ground floor is home to one of Florence's more fashionable and historical cafés – "Rivoire", founded in 1872.

Notes

References 
Florence Monuments, Piazza della  Signoria
Palazzo delle Assicurazioni Generali, Milano 
The Generali Group

Assicurazioni Generali
Renaissance Revival architecture in Italy
Houses completed in 1871
Generali Group